General elections were held in the Turks and Caicos Islands on 4 November 1980. The result was a victory for the opposition Progressive National Party (PNP), which won eight of the eleven seats in the Legislative Council. Following the elections, PNP leader Norman Saunders became Chief Minister.

Electoral system
The eleven members of the Legislative Council were elected from single-member constituencies.

Campaign
A total of 24 candidates contested the elections, with the PNP and People's Democratic Movement (PDM) running in all eleven constituencies. The other two candidates were independents.

Results

References

Elections in the Turks and Caicos Islands
Turks
1980 in the Turks and Caicos Islands
November 1980 events in North America